Arlette Marie-Laure Lefebvre, known by her patients as "Dr. Froggie" (born 26 July 1947) is a child psychiatrist at the Hospital for Sick Children in Toronto, Ontario, Canada.

Born in Montreal, Quebec, she received a Bachelor of Arts degree in 1964 from the Université de Caen and a Doctor of Medicine degree in 1970 from the University of Toronto. Lefebvre is also an associate professor at the University of Toronto.

She is a member of both the Order of Ontario and the Order of Canada. In 1991, she founded Ability Online. In 1996, she was inducted into the Terry Fox Hall of Fame.

References

External links
Dr. Froggie's Favourite Links

1947 births
Living people
Canadian psychiatrists
Child psychiatrists
Members of the Order of Canada
Members of the Order of Ontario
People from Montreal
People from Toronto
Canadian Disability Hall of Fame
University of Toronto alumni
Academic staff of the University of Toronto
Canadian women psychiatrists